Adarsh (Devanagari: आदर्श ) is an Indian male name that denotes "an ideal".

Notable people 

 Taran Adarsh, Indian film critic, journalist, editor and film trade analyst, the son of B. K. Adarsh
 Adarsh Balakrishna, Indian film actor
 Adarsh Kumar Goel, a former judge of the Supreme Court of India
 Adarsh Rathore, Indian journalist, musician and folk singer
 Adarsh Sein Anand, the 29th Chief Justice of India
 Adarsh Shastri, leader of the Aam Aadmi Party
 Adarsh Shinde (born 1988), playback singer

See also 
 Adarsha (disambiguation)

References 

Hindu given names
Hindu surnames
Indian surnames
Indian masculine given names